John Mallory (1610 – 1655) was an English politician.

John Mallory may also refer to:

John Mallory (American football)
John Mallory (died 1434), MP for Warwickshire (UK Parliament constituency)
John Mallory (died 1619), MP for Ripon and Thirsk
John Mallory, character in The Jury (TV serial)